is a Japanese professional footballer who plays as an attacking midfielder for J1 League club Nagoya Grampus, on loan from FC Tokyo.

Career
Takuya Uchida joined FC Tokyo in 2016. On April 24, he debuted in J3 League (v Gainare Tottori).

Club statistics
.

Honours

Club
FC Tokyo
J.League Cup: 2020

References

External links
Profile at FC Tokyo 

1998 births
Living people
Association football people from Chiba Prefecture
Japanese footballers
J1 League players
J3 League players
FC Tokyo players
FC Tokyo U-23 players
Nagoya Grampus players
Association football midfielders